René Pleimelding (13 February 1925 – 20 October 1998), was a French football defender and manager who played at the international level for France. He was the father of two professional football players, Pierre Pleimelding and Gérard Pleimelding.

Honours
 Coupe de France winner: 1957

External links
 Player bio at the official web site of the French Football Federation

1925 births
1998 deaths
Sportspeople from Meurthe-et-Moselle
French footballers
France international footballers
French football managers
AS Nancy Lorraine managers
AS Béziers Hérault (football) managers
ES Troyes AC managers
SR Colmar players
Association football defenders
Footballers from Grand Est